The Luke Richardson House is a historic house at 204 Hancock Road in Dublin, New Hampshire.  Built about 1820, it is a good local example of a mid-19th century farmhouse with modest Greek Revival features.  It was listed on the National Register of Historic Places in 1983.

Description and history
It is a -story wood-frame structure, with a gabled roof and clapboarded exterior. It has an unusually narrow profile, with a two-bay front facade. A single-story porch extends across the front and along one side. An early 20th-century barn stands nearby on the property.

The house was built c. 1820 by Luke Richardson, son of early settler Abijah Richardson, Sr, whose early homestead stands nearby.  Luke Richardson operated a gristmill and sawmill on a nearby property, and was instrumental in establishing a Trinitarian Congregational church in Dublin in 1827.  Later owners include Charles F. Appleton, who built a hydroelectric facility on Wilder Brook and provided Dublin with its first electric service, and artist Tom Blackwell, who used the barn on the property as his studio.

See also
Abijah Richardson Sr. Homestead
Deacon Abijah Richardson House
John Richardson Homestead
National Register of Historic Places listings in Cheshire County, New Hampshire

References

Houses on the National Register of Historic Places in New Hampshire
Greek Revival houses in New Hampshire
Houses completed in 1820
Houses in Dublin, New Hampshire
National Register of Historic Places in Dublin, New Hampshire